The following radio stations broadcast on AM frequency 560 kHz: The Federal Communications Commission categorizes 560 AM as a regional frequency; the maximum power for any station on this frequency (in the United States) is 5,000 watts.

Argentina 
 LRA9 in Esquel, Chubut.
 LRA13 in Bahía Blanca, Buenos Aires.
 LRA16 in La Quiaca, Jujuy.
 LT15 in San Antonio de Padua de la Concordia, Entre Ríos.
 LV1 in San Juan, San Juan.

Brazil 
 ZYH456 in Itabuna
 ZYH604 in Limoeiro do Norte
 ZYH887 in São Luís, Maranhão
 ZYI-806 in Mamanguape
 ZYJ-214 in Londrina
 ZYJ-281 in Guarapuava
 ZYJ-496 in Araruama
 ZYK-231 in Caxias do Sul
 ZYK419 in Tangará da Serra
 ZYK761 in Santa Isabel
 ZYL277 in Patrocinio

Canada 
 CFOS in Owen Sound, Ontario - 7.5 kW daytime, 1 kW nighttime, transmitter located at

Colombia 
 HJGS in Tunja
 HJPF in Maicao

Cuba 
 CMIA in Ciego de Ávila

Dominican Republic 
 HIAA in Santiago

Ecuador 
 HCBN2 in Guayaquil

Guyana 
 8RG in Sparendaam

Honduras 
 HRPX in San Pedro Sula

Jamaica 
 JCB in Naggo Head

Mexico
 XEGIK-AM in Ciudad Frontera, Coahuila
 XEMZA-AM in Cihuatlán, Jalisco
 XEOC-AM in Mexico City
 XESRD-AM in Mesa San Antonio, Durango
 XEYO-AM in Huatabampo, Sonora

Panama 
 HOH 2 in Nuevo San Juan

Peru 
 OBZ4L in Lima

United States

Venezuela 
 YVRH in Puerto Ordaz

References

Lists of radio stations by frequency